Attalea may refer to :

 Attalea (plant), a genus of palms
List of Attalea species
 Attalea in Lydia, an ancient city, now Yanantepe in Turkey, and bishopric, now a titular see
 Attalea in Pamphylia, an ancient city, now Antalya in Turkey, and bishopric, now a titular see

See also